, also known by  and his Chinese style name , was a royal of Ryukyu Kingdom.

Prince Nakijin was the tenth head of the royal family Gushichan Udun. His ancestors had been offered hereditary office  for a long time. He was the eldest son of Nakijin Chōki; his mother was a  called . His rank was Aji (lord) at first. In 1747, he was elevated to the rank Wōji (prince), which was the highest rank among royals.

He was granted Nakijin magiri (modern Nakijin, Okinawa) as his hereditary fief in 1724. He was also granted Nakijin Castle in 1742, and built a memorial stele, in the castle to commemorate it. Now the stele it still standing in the castle and is recognized Tangible Cultural Property of Okinawa Prefecture in 2002.

King Shō Boku dispatched a gratitude envoy for his accession to Edo, Japan in 1752. They sailed back in the next year.

Prince Nakijin served as sessei from 1755 to 1770.

References

|-

1702 births
1787 deaths
Princes of Ryūkyū
Sessei
People of the Ryukyu Kingdom
Ryukyuan people
18th-century Ryukyuan people